Malika may refer to:

Places

Nepal
Malika, Baglung, a municipality
Malika, Dailekh, a village development committee
Malika Bota, a village development committee
Malika Rural Municipality, Gulmi
Malika Rural Municipality, Myagdi
Malika Dhuri, a mountain

Elsewhere
Malika, Thailand, a tambon
Malika Parbat, a mountain in Pakistan

Other uses
Malika (given name)
Malika, a 2015 EP by Tālā

See also
Malikaa, a 2017 Maldivian film
Malikah (disambiguation)
Mallika (disambiguation)